Helge Thorsten Lumbsch (born 1964) is a German-born lichenologist living in the United States. His research interests include the phylogeny, taxonomy, and phylogeography of lichen-forming fungi; lichen diversity; lichen chemistry and chemotaxonomy. He is the Associate Curator and Head of Cryptogams and Chair of the Department of Botany at the Field Museum of Natural History.

Biography
Lumbsch was born in Frankfurt in 1964. Interested in lichens already as a schoolboy, he studied natural sciences at the University of Marburg, under the tutelage of Aino Henssen. He received his diploma in 1989, with a dissertation titled Ontogenetisch-systematische Studien der Trapeliaceae und verwandter Familien (Lichenisierte Ascomyceten) ("Ontogenic-systematic studies of the Trapeliaceae and related families (lichenized ascomycetes"). After Henssen's retirement in 1990, he transferred to the University in Essen, where he worked on the Lecanora subfusca group in Australasia, a subject that was the topic of his PhD dissertation. In 1993 he completed his doctorate under the supervision of Guido Benno Feige.

Between 1994 and 1997, Lumbsch did postdoctoral research at the Botanical Garden of the University of Duisburg-Essen; in 1998–2003 he was a private lecturer there. Between 2003 and 2006 he was the Assistant curator at the Field Museum of Natural History. Since 2004, Lumbsch has been a member of committee on Evolutionary Biology at the University of Chicago, an interdepartmental and inter-institutional graduate student training program. In the years 2005–2009 he was the head of Cryptogams at the Field Museum, and between 2006 and 2014, the Associate Curator. Lumbsch was the president of the International Association for Lichenology in the years 2012–2016.

Lumbsch has been the author or coauthor of more than 500 publications, many of which deal with molecular phylogenetics of various taxa of lichens. In his 2009 survey of influential lichenologists, Ingvar Kärnefelt calls him "a leading scientist on systematics and evolution of lichenized fungi."

Eponymy
Several lichen species have been named in honour of Lumbsch, including:
Paraparmelia lumbschii ; Graphina lumbschii ; Sticta lumbschiana ; Fissurina lumbschiana ;  Ocellularia lumbschii ; and Pertusaria lumbschii .

Selected publications

A partial list of his publications (249) may be found by accessing the Scholia link above.

References

Cited literature
 

1964 births
German lichenologists
German taxonomists
Scientists from Frankfurt
University of Marburg alumni
University of Duisburg-Essen alumni
Living people